HMS Cheerful (J388) was a turbine engine-powered  during the Second World War.

Design and description

The ships' complement consisted of 85 officers and ratings.

The reciprocating ships had two vertical triple-expansion steam engines, each driving one shaft, using steam provided by two Admiralty three-drum boilers.

The Algerine class was armed with a QF  Mk V anti-aircraft gun and four twin-gun mounts for Oerlikon 20 mm cannon. The latter guns were in short supply when the first ships were being completed and they often got a proportion of single mounts. By 1944, single-barrel Bofors 40 mm mounts began replacing the twin 20 mm mounts on a one for one basis. All of the ships were fitted for four throwers and two rails for depth charges.

Construction and career
The ship was ordered on 30 August 1941 at the Harland & Wolff at Belfast, Ireland. She was laid down on 20 August 1943 and launched on 22 May 1944. The ship was commissioned on 13 October 1944.

In April 1945, she took part in the minesweeping operations together with 18th and 10th Minesweeping Flotilla to the passage to Cuxhaven and Hamburg, also known as Operation Dropkick.

In October 1947, she was decommissioned and put into the reserve fleet.

In 1951, she was recommissioned and put into the Fisheries Protection Flotilla. In June 1953, she took part in the Coronation Review at Spithead. She was out of service again in 1954.

In 1966, she was sold to BISCO for scrap by the Lacmots at Queenborough, Kent in which she arrived in September of the same year.

References

Bibliography
 
 
 Peter Elliott (1977) Allied Escort Ships of World War II. MacDonald & Janes,

External links
 

 

Algerine-class minesweepers of the Royal Navy
Ships built in Belfast
1944 ships
World War II minesweepers of the United Kingdom